The Waterloo Regional Police Service (WRPS) provides policing services for the Regional Municipality of Waterloo in Ontario, Canada, which encompasses the cities of Waterloo, Kitchener, and Cambridge, as well as the townships of North Dumfries, Wellesley, Wilmot and Woolwich.
The WRPS was established in 1973, to replace the individual police departments in the region. The cities of Kitchener, Waterloo and Galt; the towns of Preston, Hespeler, Elmira and New Hamburg; the Village of Bridgeport and Waterloo Township had their own respective police department. The townships of Woolwich, Wellesley, Wilmot and North Dumfries were under the jurisdiction of the Ontario Provincial Police. In 1991 the Waterloo Regional Police Force was renamed to their current name.

Organization

On July 15, 2014, Bryan Larkin was named chief of police.  He replaced Matt Torigian, who had been chief of police since December, 2007.  In 1991, to minimize the negativity associated with the word force, the department changed its name from "Waterloo Regional Police Force" to "Waterloo Regional Police Service".

Headquarters

The WRPS' headquarters is located at 200 Maple Grove Road on the border with Cambridge and Kitchener. This site was chosen as it is geographically centre to all the urban areas within the region. Waterloo Regional Police Headquarters has a museum in the lobby complete with old uniforms, equipment and information on the departments prior to 1973.

Operational patrol divisions

North - formerly Division 3 - 45 Columbia St. E., Waterloo

Central - formerly Division 1 - 134 Frederick St, Kitchener

South - formerly Division 2 - 176 Hespeler Rd, Cambridge

Rural North - formerly Division 3A- 13 Industrial Dr, Elmira

Rural South - formerly Division 1A- 34 Peel St, New Hamburg

Branches and divisions

The Waterloo Regional Police Service is made up of:

Patrol divisions
 North Division - serving the City of Waterloo, and areas of Kitchener not served by Central Division
 Central Division - serving the City of Kitchener (East of Victoria Street, south of Belmont Ave to Highland and south of Westmount to Highway 7/8)
 South Division - serving the City of Cambridge, and areas of Kitchener (Doon South, Trillium Industrial Park, Parkway, Hidden Valley)
 Rural North - serving Woolwich and Wellesley townships
 Rural South  - serving Wilmot and North Dumfries townships

All divisions have a criminal investigations branch.

Investigative services

 Homicide
 Major case unit
 Fraud branch
 Traffic services
 Forensic identification
 Domestic violence unit
 Elder abuse
 Traffic
 Collision reporting centre
 Technical crime unit

Strategic and tactical services (Division 7)

 Special response unit
 Drug branch
 Intelligence

Support services

 Communications branch
 Records branch
 Evidence management
 Court services
 Information technology

Community and corporate services

 Community resources
 Human resources
 Training branch
 Quality assurancePolicing standards

 Public complaints

Executive office

 Media relations
 Emergency planning
 Research and planning
 Business planning

Shoulder flashes

Shoulder flashes are worn on the uniforms of Waterloo Regional Police officers.

Fleet

Current vehicles in service

 Ford Police Interceptor Sedan
 Ford Police Interceptor Utility
 Dodge Magnum
 Ford E-Series 
 GMC Savana
 Mercedes-Benz Sprinter

Vehicle markings
Marked cruisers are white, with hood, trunk lid, front and rear quarter panels and bumpers painted navy blue. The text Waterloo Regional Police in silver retroreflective text with a navy blue outline appears on the sides of the vehicles. A distinct solid red line curves from the front, through to the rear of the vehicle, with the motto "People Helping People" and "911" on the rear quarter panel. A series of white horizontal stripes appear above and below the curved red stripe. The crest of the police service appears on the rear pillar as well. A Canadian flag in addition to any special designations for the vehicle, such as "supervisor", "traffic", "duty officer" are displayed on the front fender. On the rear of the cruiser, the text "Waterloo Regional Police" is displayed on the left side of the trunk lid, and the vehicle number and divisional designation (where applicable) on the right side. On the bumper appears the police service website (wrps.on.ca), along with the Crime Stoppers tip-line number encompassed by retroreflective chevrons. Affixed to the roof is a red and blue LED light bar, as well as several antennas for communication and GPS.

Officer ranks
The rank structure used by the WRPS is defined by regulations of Ontario's Police Services Act.
Chief of police (crown and three maple leaves)
Deputy chief (crown and two maple leaves)
Superintendent (crown)
Inspector (two maple leaves)
Staff sergeant (crown and three chevrons)
Sergeant (three chevrons)
Constable
The Waterloo Regional Police Service does not use the rank of staff superintendent or staff inspector.

Auxiliary unit
The Waterloo Regional Police Service also has an auxiliary unit, composed of approximately 75 unpaid civilian volunteers. Auxiliary officers assist with special events, parades, as well as community programs.

See also
 Integrated Security Unit
 Ceremonial Band of the Waterloo Regional Police

References

External links
Waterloo Regional Police Service

Law enforcement agencies of Ontario
Waterloo, Ontario
Regional Municipality of Waterloo
1973 establishments in Ontario